The ninth season of Law & Order premiered in the United States on NBC on September 23, 1998, and ended with a two-part episode on May 26, 1999. It was released on DVD on December 6, 2011. This was the last season of Law & Order to air alone. Its first spinoff, Law & Order: Special Victims Unit, debuted the following fall.

Cast
Abbie Carmichael (played by Angie Harmon) replaced season 8's Jamie Ross (Carey Lowell) in the role of Assistant District Attorney. Benjamin Bratt, who played Rey Curtis, left the series at the end of the 9th season, but made a special guest appearance in the episode "Fed" in the 20th and originally final season (series was revived 12 years later with season 21).

Main cast
 Jerry Orbach as Senior Detective Lennie Briscoe
 Benjamin Bratt as Junior Detective Rey Curtis
 S. Epatha Merkerson as Lieutenant Anita Van Buren
 Sam Waterston as Executive Assistant District Attorney Jack McCoy
 Angie Harmon as Assistant District Attorney Abbie Carmichael
 Steven Hill as District Attorney Adam Schiff

Recurring cast
 Carolyn McCormick as Dr. Elizabeth Olivet
 J. K. Simmons as Dr. Emil Skoda

Departure of Benjamin Bratt
Benjamin Bratt, who played Rey Curtis, left the series at the end of the 9th season, but made a special guest appearance in the episode "Fed" in the 20th and originally final season (series was revived 12 years later with season 21).

Episodes

Notes

 The TV-movie Exiled: A Law & Order Movie, which featured Chris Noth's return as Detective Mike Logan following his departure and character's reassignment to Staten Island as a punishment for assaulting a city councilman at the end of season five, aired during this season on November 8, 1998. The movie featured John Fiore's last appearance as Detective Tony Profaci, whom Fiore appeared as in a recurring role since the series debuted.
 "Hate" was dedicated to United States Attorney Charles E. Rose, with the epitaph "He made the world a safer place".
 "Juvenile" has a pre-end credits text card stating Andrew Hampton was serving his sentence at Clinton Correctional Facility and Nicole Hampton was acquitted for the shooting of Gerald Fox.  The last time these cards were used was the season 7 episode "Barter" and the season 1 episode "The Violence of Summer."
 Carolyn McCormick reprised her role as Dr. Elizabeth Olivet between the 9th, 10th, 13th and the 20th season.  
 The introductory image for Benjamin Bratt has changed once again, making him the first ever Law & Order actor to have his photo changed three times (Season 6 has one photo, Seasons 7 - 8 has another photo and Season 9 has final photo); S. Epatha Merkerson's introductory image also changed.

References

External links
 Episode guide from NBC.com

09
1998 American television seasons
1999 American television seasons